Micraglossa flavidalis is a moth in the family Crambidae. It was described by George Hampson in 1907. It is found in the Chinese provinces of Gansu, Shaanxi, Henan, Sichuan, Hubei, Guizhou and Yunnan.

The length of the forewings is 5.5-7.5 mm for males and 6–7 mm for females. The ground colour of the forewings ranges from pale to golden, suffused with black. There are two black spots on the basal area. The subterminal and postmedian line form an X shape.

References

Moths described in 1907
Scopariinae